They Who Dare is a BBC TV series that ran for two series (each of eight episodes) from 1995 until 1996. It consisted of short documentaries profiling individuals or groups who take part in extreme sports. It was produced by Tony Rayner and narrated by Terry Molloy. Many of the episodes have been repeated but none have been rebroadcast since 1998  the theme was taken from The Mission soundtrack, composed by Ennio Morricone.

List of Episodes

References

External links
 BBC site

1995 British television series debuts
1996 British television series endings
BBC television documentaries
English-language television shows